Lilieci may refer to several villages in Romania:

 Lilieci, a village in Hemeiuș Commune, Bacău County
 Lilieci, a village in Sinești Commune, Ialomița County